Sphindocis denticollis is a species of beetle in the family Ciidae, the only species in the genus Sphindocis.

References

Monotypic Cucujiformia genera
Ciidae genera